Djelal Munif Bey or Celal Münif Bey (1871 - 1928) was an Ottoman diplomat who served at various posts including New York and Budapest. He was the Ottoman Consul General to the United States in New York. Although he was said to be murdered or committed suicide in September 1919 in Budapest, later it turned out to be that his wife committed suicide but he was alive. He was sent to New York for a second time to serve as the Turkish Consul General in 1926 and remained in this post for two years until his death on January 14, 1928.

See also
 Ottoman Empire-United States relations

References

1919 deaths
20th-century Turkish diplomats
Ottoman Empire–United States relations
Committee of Union and Progress politicians
1871 births